100 Lekë (100 L) has a value of 100 Albanian lek. It exists as both a coin and a banknote.

References

Currencies of Albania
One-hundred-base-unit coins